The Alay Valley is a broad, dry valley running east–west across most of southern Osh Region, Kyrgyzstan. The north side is the Alay Mountains which slope down to the Ferghana Valley. The south side is the Trans-Alay Range along the Tajikistan border, with Lenin Peak,. The western  or so is more hills than valley. On the east there is the low Tongmurun pass and then more valley leading to the Irkestam border crossing to China.

The eastern Kyzyl-Suu ('Red River') flows from the Tongmurun rise past Irkestam toward Kashgar. The western Kyzyl-Suu flows west from the Tongmurun rise and drains most of the valley, flowing on the north side. It exits through the Karamyk pass and a gorge into Tajikistan, where, under the name of the Vakhsh River it flows southwest into the Amu Darya.  Highway A371 runs along the valley.  The western pass to Tajikistan is closed to foreigners, but the eastern pass to China is open.  A371 intersects the M41 highway north to Osh at Sary-Tash. To the south, M41 (Pamir Highway) becomes very rough and leads to the  Kyzyl-Art pass to Murgab in Tajikistan, a route that requires considerable preparation and paperwork.

The valley has a population of approximately 17,000 and is almost entirely Kyrgyz with a few pockets of Tajik population. One traveler says "with no jobs, a harsh winter climate, and poor conditions for agriculture, life is immensely tough here, and most of the adult male population have left to seek work elsewhere."

Places in or near the valley: Irkestam, Nura, Sary-Tash, Achiktash, Lenin Peak, Sary-Mogol, Kashka-Suu, Bordobo, Kara-Kabak, Kyzyl-Eshme, Daroot-Korgon, Chak, Jar-Bashy, Karamyk, Achyk-Suu.

See also

The Alai Valley in Pakistan is east of Besham.  The population is mostly Pathan and lived under their own nawab until the late 1970s.

References

Valleys of Kyrgyzstan